Michael Anthony Aird  (born 12 April 1949 in Melbourne) is a former Tasmanian politician. He was an ALP member of the Tasmanian Legislative Council in the Division of Derwent since 1995. From 2006 to 2010, he was the treasurer of Tasmania, one of few legislative councillors in history to have held a ministerial portfolio and the first to serve as Treasurer as previous Treasurers has been from the lower house, the House of Assembly. He took over the role of Treasurer from Paul Lennon after the 2006 state election.

He was Government leader in the Legislative Council from 1998 to 2006.

Aird first entered parliament in 1979, as a member of the House of Assembly seat of Franklin. He was a member from 1979 until 1986, and then again from 1989 until 1995. During this time, he held many ministerial positions, including Environment, Industrial Relations, Employment, and Education.

When Labor member Charles Batt retired in 1995, Aird successfully contested election in the seat of Derwent. He was re-elected in 1997, 2003, and 2009. On 9 November 2010, Aird announced that he was retiring from politics and that he would step down as Treasurer and as a Legislative Council member on 6 December. His interests include sport and the arts.

In 2016 Aird was appointed a Member of the Order of Australia for significant service to the Parliament and community of Tasmania, particularly to infrastructure development and microeconomic reform.

See also

Members of the Tasmanian Legislative Council

References

External links
MichaelAird.org electoral website
 
Michael Aird's maiden speech to Legislative Council

Members of the Tasmanian Legislative Council
Australian Labor Party members of the Parliament of Tasmania
Members of the Tasmanian House of Assembly
Treasurers of Tasmania
Members of the Order of Australia
Living people
1949 births
Politicians from Melbourne
21st-century Australian politicians